1982 Extraordinary Ministerial Meeting of the Non-Aligned Movement on the topic of Palestine took place in Kuwait City, capital of Kuwait from 5 to 8 April. It was the first of the three meetings on Palestine that the Non-Aligned Movement organized in that year. The meeting in Kuwait was called by the Coordinating Bureau of the Movement during the NAM United Nations Headquarters meeting in New York which took place between 25 and 28 September 1981. The meeting provided the first opportunity for Egypt, one of the founding members of the Movement, to attends a conference in an Arab country that severed diplomatic relations with Cairo after the 1978 Camp David Accord.

Participants
Participants of the meeting were categorized and listed in different groups which included; 
 Members of the Coordinating Bureau; Bangladesh, Benin, Bhutan, Burundi, People's Republic of the Congo, Cuba, Cyprus, Democratic People's Republic of Korea, South Yemen, Ethiopia, Ghana, Guyana, India, Indonesia, Iraq, Jamaica, Jordan, Laos, Lesotho, Madagascar, Mauritania, Mozambique, Nigeria, Palestine Liberation Organization, Panama, Peru, Somalia, Sri Lanka, Syria, Togo, Cameroon, SFR Yugoslavia, Zaire and Zambia.
 Other members of the movement; Afghanistan, Algeria, Angola, Bahrain, Comoros, Ecuador, Egypt, Grenada, Guinea, Iran, Kenya, Kuwait, Lebanon, Libyan Arab Jamahiriya, Malaysia, Maldives, Mali, Malta, Morocco, Nicaragua, Niger, Oman, Pakistan, Qatar, Sao Tome and Principe, Saudi Arabia, Senegal, South West African People's Organization, Sudan, Suriname, Tunisia, United Arab Emirates, Tanzania, Upper Volta, Vietnam and Yemen Arab Republic.
 Observer countries, organizations and national liberation movements; Philippines, African National Congress, Organization of the Islamic Conference, Organization of African Unity, United Nations and League of Arab States.
 Guest countries and organizations; Austria, Finland, Romania, Sweden, Committee on the Exercise of the Inalienable Rights of the Palestinian People, Special Committee against Apartheid, United Nations Council for Namibia and International Committee of the Red Cross.

References

See also
 Foreign relations of Kuwait
 International recognition of the State of Palestine

Palestine
Foreign relations of Kuwait
History of Kuwait City
1982 conferences
1982 in politics
1982 in Kuwait
Israeli–Palestinian conflict